The 2016 season is Tromsø's second season back in the Tippeligaen following their relegation in 2013, their 29th season in the top flight of Norwegian football and their first season with Bård Flovik as their manager.

Squad

Transfers

Winter

In:

Out:

Summer

In:

Out:

Competitions

Tippeligaen

Results summary

Results by round

Results

Table

Norwegian Cup

Squad statistics

Appearances and goals

|-
|colspan="14"|Players away from Tromsø on loan:
|-
|colspan="14"|Players who left Tromsø during the season:

|}

Goal scorers

Disciplinary record

References

Tromsø IL seasons
Tromsø